Castleshaw is a hamlet in the Saddleworth parish of the Metropolitan Borough of Oldham in Greater Manchester, England.

Historically a part of the West Riding of Yorkshire, Castleshaw is most notable for the Castleshaw Roman fort, the remains of an ancient castrum. There are two reservoirs, Castleshaw upper reservoir and Castleshaw lower reservoir. In 2016, United Utilities reinforced the walls on the lower reservoir but had to drop water levels by 1m.

History

There used to be a Roman fort situated near to the head of the valley. A series of modern mounds and ditches have been laid out to mark the site, on the edge of Castleshaw Upper Reservoir. The Castleshaw area was once also home to a sanitorium, which is now used as  a Youth Training Centre.

References

Villages in Greater Manchester
Towns and villages of the Peak District
Geography of the Metropolitan Borough of Oldham
Saddleworth